"I Got" is a song by New Zealand hip hop group Fast Crew, released in May 2004 as the first single from their debut album, Set the Record Straight (2004). It propelled the group to stardom in New Zealand, peaking at number four on the New Zealand Singles Chart and spending 23 weeks in the top 50. The following year, in 2005, the song found success in Australia, where it reached number 22 on the ARIA Singles Chart.

Release and reception
Following performances at major music festivals such as the Big Day Out and rallying support from the underground hip hop community, Fast Crew began to earn mainstream success in 2002 following the release of their debut single, "Mr Radio", and "I Got" was eventually released in May 2004 as the first single from their 2004 album, Set the Record Straight. "I Got" debuted at number 26 on the New Zealand Singles Chart on 31 May 2004 and slowly rose up the chart, peaking at number four for two weeks in July and August. Their newfound success earned ovations from audiences as they supported several international musical acts, including Missy Elliott and Busta Rhymes. The single was eventually certified gold by the Recording Industry Association of New Zealand (now Recorded Music NZ) for selling over 5,000 copies. It was New Zealand's 17th best-selling single of 2004.

On 16 May 2005, the song was released in Australia. On 29 May, it debuted and peaked at number 22 on the ARIA Singles Chart, then spent the next eight weeks descending the listing, making a re-appearance at number 49 on 14 August 2005. The Elite Fleet remix of "I Got" found popularity at Australian clubs, peaking at number four on the ARIA Club Tracks chart and finishing 2005 as the 36th-most-successful club hit.

Track listings
New Zealand CD single
 "I Got" – 3:54
 "I Got" (instrumental) – 3:54
 "Suburbia Streets" (radio edit) – 4:24
 "Suburbia Streets" (instrumental) – 4:24
 "I Got" (video)

Australian CD single
 "I Got" – 3:54
 "Whoa There I Go Again" – 3:56
 "Make the World Spin" – 4:56
 "I Got" (Bump City remix) – 3:30
 "I Got" (Elite Fleet remix) – 3:53
 "I Got" (The Magic Number remix) – 3:49
 "I Got" (video)

Charts

Weekly charts

Year-end charts

Certifications

Release history

References

2004 singles
2004 songs
2005 singles
Fast Crew songs
Warner Music Group singles